Winsome is a given name, and may refer to:

 Winsome Andante (born 1993), English eventing horse
 Winsome Brown (born 1973), Obie-award-winning NYC-based actress and writer
 Winsome Evans (born 1941), Australian early music specialist
 Winsome McCaughey, Lord Mayor of Melbourne from 1988 to 1989
 Winsome Pinnock (born 1961), British playwright
 Winsome Sears (born 1964), American politician
 Winsome Witch, fictional title character of an animated cartoon series